CJDC may refer to:

 CJDC (AM), a radio station (890 AM) licensed to Dawson Creek, British Columbia, Canada
 CJDC-TV, a television station (channel 5) licensed to Dawson Creek, British Columbia, Canada
 The Central Jakarta District Court